Prior to its uniform adoption of proportional representation in 1999, the United Kingdom used first-past-the-post for the European elections in England, Scotland and Wales. The European Parliament constituencies used under that system were smaller than the later regional constituencies and only had one Member of the European Parliament each.

The constituency of Northumbria was one of them.

Boundaries
1979-1984: Berwick-upon-Tweed, Blyth, Hexham, Morpeth, Newcastle-upon-Tyne Central, Newcastle-upon-Tyne East, Newcastle-upon-Tyne North, Newcastle-upon-Tyne West, Wallsend
1984-1999: Berwick-upon-Tweed, Blyth Valley, Hexham, Newcastle-upon-Tyne Central, Newcastle-upon-Tyne North, Tynemouth, Wallsend, Wansbeck.

Members of the European Parliament

Election results

References

External links
 David Boothroyd's United Kingdom Election Results

European Parliament constituencies in North East England (1979–1999)
Politics of Northumberland
Politics of Newcastle upon Tyne
1979 establishments in England
1999 disestablishments in England
Constituencies established in 1979
Constituencies disestablished in 1999